Appleton is an unincorporated community in Cecil County, Maryland, United States. Appleton is located at the intersection of Maryland Route 273 and Appleton Road, north of Elkton and east of Fair Hill.

References

Unincorporated communities in Cecil County, Maryland
Unincorporated communities in Maryland